The Accademia del Cinema Italiano is an organization that gives out the David di Donatello Awards. It was founded in 1955 as a part of the Open Gate Club, originally with the name Ente David di Donatello. The organization became independent in 1963. In 2007 it assumed its current name.

Presidents
Italo Gemini (1963-1970)
Eitel Monaco (1971-1977)
Paolo Grassi (1978-1980)
Gian Luigi Rondi (1981-2016)
Giuliano Montaldo (2016-2017) (ad interim)
Piera Detassis (since 2018)

References

External links
 
 David di Donatello 1956–2016: 60 Years of Awards. Journal of Italian Cinema & Media Studies (2016), 4 (2), Intellect, 

Organizations established in 1963
Film-related professional associations
1963 establishments in Italy